The 2021-22 season will be the 6th season of Jong FC Utrecht at the second level of Dutch football. Before that, they played in the Beloften Eredivisie.

Players

U23-team squad

Transfers

Summer

Transfers in 2021/22

Transfers out 2021/22

Winter

Transfers in 2021/22

Transfers out 2021/22

Pre-season and friendlies

Competition

Overall record

Eerste Divisie

League table

Period 1

Period 2

Period 3

Period 4

Results summary

Results by round

Matches
The league fixtures were announced on 11 June 2021.

Statistics

Goalscorers 
Friendlies

Assists

Attendance Stadion Galgenwaard

Attendance Sportcomplex Zoudenbalch

References

External links

FC Utrecht seasons
FC Utrecht